KYOY (92.3 FM, "Greatest Hits On The Planet") is a radio station broadcasting a classic hits music format. Licensed to Hillsdale, Wyoming, United States, the station is currently owned by Lorenz Proietti, through licensee Proshop Radio Broadcasting, LLC.

Translators
In addition to the main station, KYOY is relayed by additional translators to widen its broadcast area.

References

External links

YOY
Classic hits radio stations in the United States
Laramie County, Wyoming
Radio stations established in 1973
1973 establishments in Wyoming